Otto Schulz may refer to:
Otto Eugen Schulz (1874–1936), German botanist
Otto Schulz (pilot) (1911–1942), German fighter pilot and flying ace of World War II
Otto Schulz (admiral) (1900–1974), German Konteradmiral and sea commander
Otto Schulz-Kampfhenkel (1910–1989), German geographer, explorer, writer and film producer